This is a list of Taiwanese dramas since 2011.

2011 to 2020

2011

2012

2013

2014

2015

2016

2017

2018

2019

2020

See also
 List of Taiwanese dramas from 2000 to 2010
 List of Taiwanese dramas from 2021 to present
 Taiwanese drama
 Television in Taiwan
 List of Chinese-language television channels
 List of Taiwanese television series

References

2011
Dramas
Dramas from 2011

ja:台湾ドラマ
zh:台灣偶像劇列表